The Eastern Zone was one of the three regional zones of the 1981 Davis Cup.

6 teams entered the Eastern Zone in total. With the introduction of a new tiered format, the previous year's semifinalists bypassed Zonal competition and qualified directly for the new 16-team World Group. The remaining teams would now compete for a place in the following year's World Group.

India defeated Indonesia in the final and qualified for the 1982 World Group.

Participating nations

Draw

Quarterfinals

Thailand vs. Malaysia

Chinese Taipei vs. Indonesia

Semifinals

Thailand vs. India

Indonesia vs. Pakistan

Final

Indonesia vs. India

References

External links
Davis Cup official website

Davis Cup Asia/Oceania Zone
Eastern Zone